Naomi Duguid (born 1950 in Ottawa, Ontario) is a food writer and photographer from Canada. Duguid is based in Toronto and has coauthored six cookbooks, and well as Burma: Rivers of Flavor in 2012 which was her first solo publication. She is best known for her cookbooks co-written with her ex-husband Jeffrey Alford.

Duguid attended Queen's University in Kingston, Ontario and proceeded through law school. After travelling around the world Naomi met Jeffrey Alford in Tibet in 1985 and the two were soon married.

She quit her job as a lawyer and went into writing cookbooks in 1995. She has jointly put out five books with her husband on world cooking. All five books have gone on to be major successes and have won Cookbook of the Year from the James Beard Foundation in 1996 and 2001 as well as Cuisine Canada Cookbook Award in 1999 and 2004.

Alford and Duguid have two sons together, and lived in Toronto, Canada until they separated in 2009.  Naomi Duguid continues to live in Toronto, and Jeffrey Alford now lives in Thailand.

Books
Flatbreads and Flavors: A Culinary Atlas (1995)
Home Baking: Sweet and Savory Traditions from Around the World (2003)
Hot Sour Salty Sweet: A Culinary Journey Through Southeast Asia (2000)
Seductions of Rice (1998)
Mangoes and Curry Leaves: Culinary Travels Through the Great Subcontinent (2005)
Beyond the Great Wall: Recipes and Travels in the Other China (2008)Burma: Rivers of Flavor (2012)Taste of Persia: A Cook's Travels Through Armenia, Azerbaijan, Georgia, Iran, and Kurdistan (2016)The Miracle of Salt: Recipes and Techniques to Preserve, Ferment, and Transform Your Food'' (2022)

References

Further reading

External links

 Official Website

1950 births
Canadian food writers
Living people
Queen's University at Kingston alumni
Women food writers
Women cookbook writers
Writers from Ottawa
James Beard Foundation Award winners